Edward Bower (fl. 1635 – 1667) was an English portrait painter. During the Civil War he worked mostly for Parliamentarian patrons, and painted Charles I at his trial. He portrayed other famous men of the time such as Lord Fairfax and John Pym. He worked primarily in London.

Some of his works were engraved by Wenceslaus Hollar.

Notes

Attribution:

External links

Edward Bower on Artnet
Portraits by Edward Bower (National Portrait Gallery)
Portrait of Sir John Drake (c. 1646 - Tate Gallery, London)
Speaker William Lenthall 1591-1662 and his family ("Art in Parliament")
Portrait of Sir William Fairfax (c. 1640s - Philip Mould Ltd)

17th-century English painters
English male painters
English portrait painters
Year of death unknown
Year of birth uncertain